Days in the Diaspora is a 2008 book by Egyptian author Kamal Ruhayyim, translated into English in 2012.

It constitutes the second part of the "Galal trilogy", dealing with the life of Galal, an Egyptian man with a Muslim father and a Jewish mother. The unforgiving 1960s lead Galal and his family to exile in Paris, where he endures several hardships.

This book was translated into English by Sarah Enany and published by AUC Press.

See also 

 1956–57 exodus and expulsions from Egypt

References

2012 novels
Egyptian novels
Novels set in Paris
Novels set in the 1960s
Jewish Egyptian history
Egyptian-Jewish diaspora
Jews and Judaism in Paris
Islam and Judaism
2008 novels